Utah Motorsports Campus is a race track facility located in Grantsville near Tooele, Utah, United States. It operated under the name of Miller Motorsports Park from 2006 until October 2015. The course has hosted auto, motorcycle, bicycle and kart racing, along with corporate events.

Track
The Full course is a 23-turn (28-apex),  road circuit run counterclockwise. Smaller configurations of the track can be made from the full course, including a  outer course that does not use the tighter infield lay-out, as well as two  layouts that each use half of the full course and can be run simultaneously. The Full course was the longest road racing facility in North America until the 2014 extension of Thunderhill Raceway Park. It is about  longer than the previous holder, Road America.

During the annual Tour of Utah bicycle race, the park is known for hosting the tour's "trademark" time-trial stage.

History
This track was originally conceived as a novelty track for Larry H. Miller, owner of the NBA's Utah Jazz and various automobile dealerships in the area, with a budget of about $5 million. Due to enormous local motorcycle and auto industry support, the concept gradually grew into a $100 million-plus project, one of a kind in the U.S.

The track was designed by world-renowned track designer Alan Wilson.  The kart track was opened in September 2005 and the large track was opened to the public on April 1, 2006, when APEXtrackdays ran the first motorcycle track day.

In 2006, the track's first year of operation, it hosted the Utah Grand Prix with the American Le Mans Series, a Honda Summit of Speed AMA Superbike double-header event, and the Discount Tire Sunchaser, a nine-hour endurance race of the Rolex Sports Car Series.

The track is also host to a WERA Grand National motorcycle road racing event and the regional motorcycle road racing series Masters of the Mountains, promoted by the Utah Sportbike Association.

The facility was named Motorsports Facility of the Year on November 8, 2006, by the Professional Motorsport World Expo in Cologne, Germany.

On July 14, 2007, the track hosted its first NASCAR event with a  NASCAR Camping World West Series race on the  Outer Track. The series switched to the outer course for later editions.

On August 22, 2007, Miller Motorsports Park announced a three-year deal to bring the FIM Superbike World Championship to the track; the Superbike World Championship will race at the track for the first time on June 1, 2008, with the AMA Superbike Championship. To avoid direct comparisons between World Superbike and AMA Superbike, and because of sponsorship issues, the two championships will race on different configurations of the circuit. World Superbike will use the Outercourse, while AMA Superbike and its support classes will use the Full course.

The American Le Mans Series and Rolex Sports Car Series did not return to the Utah Grand Prix for 2011, and a K&N Pro Series West race was substituted. It was also announced that AMA Superbike would return to the track in 2011 with World Superbike.

The off-road racetrack hosted a round of the Lucas Oil Off Road Racing Series from 2010 to 2018. A return was scheduled for 2020 prior to its cancellation due to the COVID-19 pandemic. The inaugural Nitro Rallycross round will take place at the track in September 2021.

Lease
It was announced on May 8, 2015, that the Larry H. Miller Group of Companies would not renew the lease on the land in Tooele County, Utah on which the park sits. The last day of operation would be October 31, 2015.

According to local news sources, as of July 17, 2015, there were several offers being considered by the Tooele County commissioners that would provide for the facility to continue operation.

On October 13, 2015, Tooele County voted to approve the sale of Miller Motorsports Park to Mitime Investment and Development Group (a subsidiary of Chinese car manufacturer Geely) for $20 million. The track will be renamed and known as Utah Motorsports Campus. Mitime officially took over the property on October 31, 2015.

On December 17, 2015, an order filed in the 3rd District Court vacated the sale of Miller Motorsports Park to Mitime Investment and Development Group, saying Tooele County shortchanged another bidder by unlawfully selling the property at a price significantly below fair market value.

On February 1, 2016, Mitime took over the management of the facility on behalf of Tooele County. This was a temporary agreement for 2016 while the county went through the process of selling the facility.  In May 2016, there were pending legal challenges to the sale, but the facility opened for business as the Utah Motorsports Campus. In November 2018, the sale to Mitime was completed. Mitime is a subsidiary of the Geely Holding Group of China

Maps

Track records

The fastest official race lap records on the Utah Motorsports Campus (formerly Miller Motorsports Park) are listed as:

References

External links

 
 Motorsport.com UMC Track News
 Utah Corporate Events
 Cruzer Palooza Car Show and Swap Meet
 Lucas Oil Off Road Truck Racing in Utah
 MotoAmerica Championship of Utah
 Pirelli World Challenge Championship Utah
 Utah Motorsports Campus Kart website

Superbike World Championship circuits
Motorsport venues in Utah
American Le Mans Series circuits
NASCAR tracks
Buildings and structures in Tooele County, Utah
Tourist attractions in Tooele County, Utah
Sports venues completed in 2006
Off-road racing venues in the United States
Museums in Tooele County, Utah
Transportation museums in Utah
2006 establishments in Utah